Prince Koranteng Amoako (born 19 November 1973) is a Ghanaian former professional footballer who played as an attacking midfielder.

Club career
Amoako was born in Kumasi.

International career
Amoako was a member of the team that reached the final of the most important South American Club Competition, Copa Libertadores playing with Sporting Cristal from Peru in 1997. They tied in Lima 0-0 and lost in Brazil to Cruzeiro 1–0. This was the first time a Peruvian team reached the final since the 1970s when Universitario de Deportes also tied and lost the final to club Independiente from Argentina.

Amoako was part of the Ghana national team at the 2002 African Nations Cup, which exited in the quarter-finals after losing to Nigeria, having finished second in Group B.

References

Living people
1979 births
Footballers from Kumasi
Alumni of the Accra Academy
Association football forwards
Ghanaian footballers
Dawu Youngstars players
Asante Kotoko S.C. players
Sporting Cristal footballers
Deportivo Municipal footballers
Granada CF footballers
Nafpaktiakos Asteras F.C. players
FC Saturn Ramenskoye players
Ghana international footballers
Footballers at the 1996 Summer Olympics
Olympic footballers of Ghana
2002 African Cup of Nations players
Ghanaian expatriate footballers
Ghanaian expatriate sportspeople in Spain
Expatriate footballers in Spain
Ghanaian expatriate sportspeople in Peru
Expatriate footballers in Peru
Ghanaian expatriate sportspeople in Greece
Expatriate footballers in Greece
Ghanaian expatriate sportspeople in Argentina
Expatriate footballers in Argentina
Ghanaian expatriate sportspeople in Russia
Expatriate footballers in Russia